The 1956 Bradley Braves baseball team represented Bradley University in the 1956 NCAA baseball season. The Braves played their home games at Tom Connor Field. The team was coached by Leo Schrall in his 8th year at Bradley.

The Braves won the District V playoff to advance to the College World Series, where they were defeated by the Minnesota Golden Gophers.

Roster

Schedule 

! style="" | Regular season
|- valign="top" 

|- align="center" bgcolor="#ccffcc"
| 1 || April  || at  || Unknown • Montgomery, Alabama || 11–1 || 1–0 || –
|- align="center" bgcolor="#ccffcc"
| 2 || April  || at Pensacola NAS || Unknown • Pensacola, Florida || 13–3 || 2–0 || –
|- align="center" bgcolor="#ccffcc"
| 3 || April  || at Pensacola NAS || Unknown • Pensacola, Florida || 24–14 || 3–0 || –
|- align="center" bgcolor="#ccffcc"
| 4 || April  || at Whiting NAS || Unknown • Milton, Florida || 13–5 || 4–0 || –
|- align="center" bgcolor="#ccffcc"
| 5 || April  || at Whiting NAS || Unknown • Milton, Florida || 10–7 || 5–0 || –
|- align="center" bgcolor="#ccffcc"
| 6 || April  || at Fort Benning || Unknown • Fort Benning South, Georgia || 7–3 || 6–0 || –
|- align="center" bgcolor="#ffcccc"
| 7 || April  || at Fort Benning || Unknown • Fort Benning South, Georgia || 4–5 || 6–1 || –
|- align="center" bgcolor="#ccffcc"
| 8 || April  || at  || Unknown • Des Moines, Iowa || 10–5 || 7–1 || 1–0
|- align="center" bgcolor="#ccffcc"
| 9 || April  || at Drake || Unknown • Des Moines, Iowa || 16–2 || 8–1 || 2–0
|- align="center" bgcolor="#ccffcc"
| 10 || April  || at Drake || Unknown • Des Moines, Iowa || 7–3 || 9–1 || 3–0
|- align="center" bgcolor="#ccffcc"
| 11 || April  ||  || Tom Connor Field • Peoria, Illinois || 5–4 || 10–1 || 4–0
|- align="center" bgcolor="#ccffcc"
| 12 || April  || Detroit || Tom Connor Field • Peoria, Illinois || 20–6 || 11–1 || 5–0
|- align="center" bgcolor="#ccffcc"
| 13 || April  || Detroit || Tom Connor Field • Peoria, Illinois || 14–2 || 12–1 || 6–0
|- align="center" bgcolor="#ccffcc"
| 14 || April  || at  || Unknown • Iowa City, Iowa || 6–2 || 13–1 || 6–0
|- align="center" bgcolor="#ffcccc"
| 15 || April  || at Iowa || Unknown • Iowa City, Iowa || 2–7 || 13–2 || 6–0
|- align="center" bgcolor="#ccffcc"
| 16 || April  ||  || Tom Connor Field • Peoria, Illinois || 16–3 || 14–2 || 6–0
|-

|- align="center" bgcolor="#ccffcc"
| 17 || May  ||  || Tom Connor Field • Peoria, Illinois || 9–1 || 15–2 || 6–0
|- align="center" bgcolor="#ffcccc"
| 18 || May  || at  || Sauget Field • Sauget, Illinois || 3–5 || 15–3 || 6–1
|- align="center" bgcolor="#ffcccc"
| 19 || May  || at Saint Louis || Sauget Field • Sauget, Illinois || 3–5 || 15–4 || 6–2
|- align="center" bgcolor="#ccffcc"
| 20 || May  || at Saint Louis || Sauget Field • Sauget, Illinois || 7–1 || 16–4 || 7–2
|- align="center" bgcolor="#ffcccc"
| 21 || May  || at  || Unknown • Normal, Illinois || 5–15 || 16–5 || 7–2
|- align="center" bgcolor="#ccffcc"
| 22 || May  ||  || Tom Connor Field • Peoria, Illinois || 11–6 || 17–5 || 7–2
|- align="center" bgcolor="#ffcccc"
| 23 || May  || Washington University || Tom Connor Field • Peoria, Illinois || 11–12 || 17–6 || 7–2
|- align="center" bgcolor="#ccffcc"
| 24 || May 22 || at  || Unknown • West Lafayette, Indiana || 4–3 || 18–6 || 7–2
|- align="center" bgcolor="#ccffcc"
| 25 || May 25 ||  || Tom Connor Field • Peoria, Illinois || 2–1 || 19–6 || 7–2
|-

|-
! style="" | Postseason
|- valign="top"

|- align="center" bgcolor="#ccffcc"
| 26 || May 11 || at  || Unknown • Stillwater, Oklahoma || 13–10 || 20–6 || 7–2
|- align="center" bgcolor="#ccffcc"
| 27 || May 12 || at Oklahoma A&M || Unknown • Stillwater, Oklahoma || 16–2 || 21–6 || 7–2
|-

|- align="center" bgcolor="#ccffcc"
| 28 || May  || vs  || Unknown • Stillwater, Oklahoma || 11–2 || 22–6 || 7–2
|-

|- align="center" bgcolor="#ccffcc"
| 28 || June 9 || vs Washington State || Omaha Municipal Stadium • Omaha, Nebraska || 4–3 || 23–6 || 7–2
|- align="center" bgcolor="#ffcccc"
| 29 || June 10 || vs Ole Miss || Omaha Municipal Stadium • Omaha, Nebraska || 0–4 || 23–7 || 7–2
|- align="center" bgcolor="#ccffcc"
| 30 || June 11 || vs Wyoming || Omaha Municipal Stadium • Omaha, Nebraska || 12–8 || 24–7 || 7–2
|- align="center" bgcolor="#ffcccc"
| 31 || June 12 || vs Minnesota || Omaha Municipal Stadium • Omaha, Nebraska || 3–8 || 24–8 || 7–2
|-

References 

Bradley
Bradley Braves baseball seasons
Bradley Braves baseball
College World Series seasons
Missouri Valley Conference baseball champion seasons